Yekaterina Yuraitis (born 8 August 1996) is a Kazakhstani racing cyclist, who most recently rode for UCI Women's Team .

Major results
Source: 

2013
 Asian Junior Cycling Championships
2nd  Time trial
8th Road race
2014
 Asian Junior Cycling Championships
1st  Time trial
8th Road race
 Track Clubs ACC Cup 
1st Individual pursuit
1st Points race
2015
 1st  Time trial, National Road Championships
2016
 1st  Time trial, National Road Championships
 Track Clubs ACC Cup 
1st Individual pursuit
2nd Team pursuit (with Nadezhda Geneleva, Faina Potapova and Tatyana Geneleva)
 Track Asia Cup
2nd Individual pursuit
2nd Team pursuit (with Nadezhda Geneleva, Zhanerke Sanakbayeva and Rinata Akhmetcha)
2017
 1st  Time trial, Asian Under-23 Road Championships
 2nd Time trial, National Road Championships

See also
 List of 2016 UCI Women's Teams and riders

References

External links
 
 

1996 births
Living people
Kazakhstani female cyclists
Place of birth missing (living people)
20th-century Kazakhstani women
21st-century Kazakhstani women